Mounira Nahdi (born 15 January 1985 in Tunis) is a Tunisian taekwondo practitioner, who competed in the women's welterweight category.

Nahdi qualified as a lone female taekwondo fighter for the Tunisian squad in the women's welterweight class (67 kg) at the 2004 Summer Olympics in Athens by placing second and granting a berth from the African Olympic Qualifying Tournament in Cairo, Egypt. She lost her opening match to neighboring Morocco's Mouna Benabderrassoul with a score of 2–6. With her opponent falling behind Puerto Rico's Ineabelle Díaz in the quarterfinals, Nahdi denied her chance to compete for the Olympic bronze medal through the repechage.

References

External links

1985 births
Living people
Tunisian female taekwondo practitioners
Olympic taekwondo practitioners of Tunisia
Taekwondo practitioners at the 2004 Summer Olympics
Sportspeople from Tunis
21st-century Tunisian women